Melanie Martinez is an American singer and songwriter. Martinez auditioned for the American television vocal talent show The Voice and became a member of Team Adam. Within the fifth week, she was eliminated which subsequently led to her beginning independent work on original material. In 2014, she released Dollhouse, her debut EP featuring the singles "Dollhouse" and "Carousel", which appeared on the trailer for the television series American Horror Story: Freak Show. In 2015, Martinez released her conceptual debut album titled Cry Baby, featuring the critically acclaimed lead single "Pity Party", along with other singles "Soap" and "Sippy Cup".

Released songs

Unreleased songs

References

 
Martinez, Melanie